Sophie Theallet (born 1964 in Bagnères-de-Bigorre, France) is a French fashion designer whose clients include First Lady Michelle Obama, Jennifer Lopez, Jessica Alba, Oprah Winfrey, and Gabrielle Union,

Career
At 18, Sophie Theallet moved to Paris to attend the fashion design school, Studio Berçot. She graduated early after winning France's "National Young Design Award" and was hired by Jean-Paul Gaultier.

Theallet then joined Azzedine Alaïa for a decade before moving to New York City. She now lives in Montreal.

After moving to New York City, Theallet continued to work with Alaïa on a part-time basis, while also freelancing for other fashion labels.

In 2007, she launched her own label, Sophie Theallet. In 2009, she won the CFDA/Vogue Fashion Fund Award. In 2012, she won the US Woolmark Prize.
In 2015, Theallet was a Couture Consultant for the movie The Dressmaker to Director Jocelyn Moorhouse starring Kate Winslet

Theallet is an advocate for inclusion, representation, and diversity in her Fashion campaigns and her Runway Shows 

In 2014, she partnered with retailer Lane Bryant to bring Fashion Luxury Design to the Plus Size market. She is a trailblazer for opening the road for representation of Plus Size models on the Runway and in High-End Fashion.

Vogue writes about her fashion shows fairly regularly. For example, the Spring 2014 show, which by standing convention was in fall 2013, generated comments from the reviewer that her work "established a tone of ripe sexuality".

In November 2016, Theallet wrote an open letter explaining that she would not be dressing future First Lady Melania Trump due to what she feels was "racist and xenophobic" rhetoric emerging from the tone of Donald Trump's campaign efforts for the U.S. presidency. She was followed shortly by designers Tom Ford and Marc Jacobs A few days later, Tommy Hilfiger responded to Theallet's statement by saying Melania "is a very beautiful woman" and that he felt "any designer should be proud to dress her".

In 2018, she and her family relocated to Montreal where she founded her new label, Room 502, a limited-edition line that is entirely self-funded and sold only through their website.

References

External links
 Official Sophie Theallet Site 
 Style.com
 Council of Fashion Designers of America
 Voguepedia
 Room 502

1964 births
French fashion designers
French women fashion designers
Living people
Protests against Donald Trump